Altus or ALTUS may refer to:

Music
Alto, a musical term meaning second highest musical or vocal type
Altus (voice type), a vocal type also known as countertenor

Places
 Altus, Arkansas, US
Altus AVA, a wine-growing region near Altus, Arkansas
 Altus, Oklahoma, US
 Altus Air Force Base, a United States Air Force facility located nearby
 Altus (Mygdonia), a town in ancient Mygdonia

Structures 
 Altus House, Leeds, a skyscraper in West Yorkshire, England
 Altus Skyscraper in Katowice, Silesia, Poland
 Solo District - Altus, a skyscraper in Burnaby, Canada

People
 Lee Altus (born 1966), Russian American guitarist

Other uses
 A sub-brand of Turkish household appliances company Arçelik A.Ş.
General Atomics ALTUS, an unmanned aerial vehicle
Altus Group, a Canadian commercial real estate services and software company
AltusGroup, a concrete company partnership

See also
Atlus, a video game developer
Attus, a spider genus (sometimes misprinted as Altus)
Alto (disambiguation)
Alta (disambiguation)